Jack Muzzell (29 August 1905 – 11 August 1996) was a South African cricketer. He played in nineteen first-class matches for Border from 1928/29 to 1934/35.

See also
 List of Border representative cricketers

References

External links
 

1905 births
1996 deaths
South African cricketers
Border cricketers
People from Stutterheim
Cricketers from the Eastern Cape